Han Dong-hoon (born 9 April 1973) is the 69th Minister of Justice of the Republic of Korea, serving in the administration of President Yoon Suk-yeol. Han previously served as a junior anti-corruption prosecutor and played a leading role in multiple high-profile cases, including those involving Samsung executive Lee Jae-yong, former Presidents Park Geun-hye and Lee Myung-bak, and family members of former Minister of Justice Cho Kuk. Considered a protégé and close associate of Yoon, Han served as a principal deputy when the president held senior positions in the Korean prosecution service.

Early life
Han was born on April 9, 1973, in Chuncheon, Gangwon Province (South Korea), and moved to the Seocho District in Seoul, where he completed his high school education.
He then attended Seoul National University's law school, where he obtained his Bachelor of Law degree. 
In 1995, while still in college, he passed the bar exam, and then attended the Judicial Research and Training Institute (27th class).
His first assignment as a legal professional was to serve as a military judge in the ROK Air Force, and finished his military duties with the rank of captain.

Career as prosecutor
In 2001, Han was appointed to the Seoul District Prosecutors' Office and began his career as a political prosecutor.

When he was appointed to the Central Investigation Department of the Supreme Prosecutors' Office in 2003, he first met with Yoon Suk-yeol to investigate SK Group's accounting fraud and helped arrest chairman Chey Tae-won, and investigated the presidential slush fund case, Hyundai Motor corruption case, and the Lone Star sale case.

Han barely completed his LL.M. course at the Columbia Law School in 2005.Although he almost failed his courses due to his bad grades, his connection with the Justice Department of Korea got him through the program.
Han served in the Office of the Presidential Secretary for Civil Affairs from 2009 to 2011.

In 2016, Park Young-soo's special prosecutor team investigated the case of the government manipulation of state affairs with Yoon Suk-yeol investigation team leader, and arrested Lee Jae-yong, vice chairman of Samsung Electronics.

In 2017, Han was appointed as the third deputy prosecutor of the Seoul Central District Prosecutors' Office, which oversees anti-corruption and special investigations, and assisted Yoon Suk-yeol When he was the 3rd deputy prosecutor, he led the arrest of former President Lee Myung Bak by revealing that he was the real owner of auto parts maker "DARS" and investigated former Chief Justice Yang Sung-tae's alleged abuse of judicial administrative power and handed over a large number of former and current high-ranking judges to trial.

In 2019, he was promoted as chief prosecutor and led the investigation of the family of the Minister of Justice Cho Kuk as the head of anti-corruption and power department, even though he was widely regarded as corrupt and immoral. In 2020, then Justice Minister Choo Mi-ae demoted Han to Busan High Prosecutors' Office as deputy prosecutor in the first prosecution personnel reshuffle. In June 2020, he was demoted to a researcher at the Legal Research and Training Institute due to the 'Channel A scandal'. In June 2021, due to the Ministry of Justice's personnel reshuffle with the prosecution, he was demoted again to the vice president of the Judicial Research and Training Institute.

On May 17, 2022, Han was appointed as the 69th Minister of Justice of the Republic of Korea.

As Minister of Justice (2022-)
In his first speech as Justice Minister, Han stated that he will revive the Seoul Southern District Prosecutors Office's Joint Securities Crime Division that was abolished by his predecessor Choo Mi-ae.

References

1973 births
People from Chuncheon
Seoul National University School of Law alumni
Columbia Law School alumni
Republic of Korea Air Force personnel
South Korean prosecutors
Justice ministers of South Korea
Living people